The ULPower UL350i is a Belgian aircraft engine, designed and produced by ULPower Aero Engines of Geluveld for use in ultralight and homebuilt aircraft.

Design and development
The engine is a four-cylinder, four-stroke, horizontally-opposed, air-cooled, direct drive, gasoline engine design. It employs dual electronic ignition, multi-point EFI and produces  at 3300 rpm.

Variants
UL350i
Base model that produces  at 3300 rpm.
UL350iS
Higher compression model that produces  at 3300 rpm.
UL350iSA
Same as UL350iS but with inverted oil system for aerobatic use.
UL350iHPS
Special version for helicopter use. It produces  at 3500 rpm.

Applications
BRM Aero Bristell
Rans S-20 Raven
Rokospol Via

Specifications (ULPower UL350i)

See also

References

External links

ULPower aircraft engines
Air-cooled aircraft piston engines
2000s aircraft piston engines